Schinia amaryllis is a moth of the family Noctuidae. It is found in South-Western North America, including California.

The wingspan is about 19 mm.

The larvae feed on Ambrosia species.

External links
Images

amaryllis
Moths of North America
Moths described in 1891